Ni Yuanlu (ca. 1593–1644) was a high-ranking official, calligrapher, and painter during the Ming dynasty of Chinese history.

Ni was born in Shangyu in the Zhejiang province. His courtesy name was "Yuru" (玉汝) and his art name was "Hongbao" (鸿宝). He passed the imperial examination in 1621 as a Jinshi (進士) and was a scholar in the Hanlin Academy. Ni's calligraphy used a semicursive script style with refined strokes. Ni committed suicide by hanging at the end of the Ming dynasty.

Notes

References
 Cihai. Shanghai: Shanghai cishu chubanshe (上海辞书出版社), 1979.

External links
Ni Yuanlu and his Calligraphy Gallery at China Online Museum

1590s births
1644 deaths
Painters from Zhejiang
Ming dynasty calligraphers
Ming dynasty painters
Politicians from Shaoxing
Ming dynasty politicians
Suicides by hanging in China
People from Shangyu
17th-century Chinese calligraphers
Artists from Shaoxing